Anger management is a psycho-therapeutic program for anger prevention and control. It has been described as deploying anger successfully. Anger is frequently a result of frustration, or of feeling blocked or thwarted from something the subject feels is important. Anger can also be a defensive response to underlying fear or feelings of vulnerability or powerlessness. Anger management programs consider anger to be a motivation caused by an identifiable reason which can be logically analyzed and addressed.

Overview 

The ideal goal of anger management is to control and regulate anger so that it does not result in problems. Anger is an active emotion that calls a person feeling it to respond. People get into anger issues because both the instigator and instigated lack interpersonal and social skills to maintain self-control. Research on affect and self-regulation shows that 
it occurs because negative emotional states often impairs impulse control. They can train to respond to their anger as unwanted and unpleasant rather than react to its need. Turning a blind eye or forgiveness is a tool to turn anger off. Getting enough sleep, exercise and good diet are tools which can assist in preventing anger. Professionals who deal with those who have trouble managing anger include occupational therapists, mental health counselors, drug and alcohol counselors, social workers, psychologists and psychiatrists.

History

The negative effects of anger have been observed throughout history. Advice for countering seemingly uncontrollable rage has been offered by ancient philosophers, pious men, and modern psychologists. In de Ira, Seneca the Younger (4 BC – 65 AD) advised for pre-emptively guarding against confrontational situations, perspective taking, and not inciting anger in anger-prone individuals. Other philosophers echoed Seneca with Galen recommending seeking out a mentor for aid in anger reduction. In the Middle Ages, the people would serve as both examples of self-control and mediators of anger-induced disputes. Examples of intercession for the common people from the wrath of local rulers abound in hagiographies. The story of St. Francis of Assisi and the metaphorical Wolf of Gubbio is one famous instance.

In modern times, the concept of controlling anger has translated into anger management programs based on the research of psychologists. Classical psychotherapy based anger management interventions originated in the 1970s. Success in treating anxiety with cognitive behavioral therapy (CBT) interventions developed by Meichebaum inspired Novaco to modify the stress inoculation training to be suitable for anger management. Stress and anger are sufficiently similar that such a modification was able to create a successful branch of treatment. Both stress and anger are caused by external stimuli, mediated by internal processing, and expressed in either adaptive or maladaptive forms. Meichebaum, and later Novaco, used each aspect of experiencing the relevant emotion as an opportunity for improvement to the patient's overall well-being.

Potential causes for development of problems

Medical causes
Drug addiction, alcoholism, a mental disability, biochemical changes and PTSD can all lead to a person committing an aggressive act against another person. Not having sufficient skills on how to handle oneself when faced with aggression can lead to very undesirable outcomes. These factors are typically associated with a heightened chance of anger, but there are other, less-known factors that can lead to people acting in a negative way. Prolonged or intense anger and frustration contributes to physical conditions such as headaches, digestive problems, high blood pressure and heart disease. Problems dealing with angry feelings may be linked to psychological disorders such as anxiety or depression. Angry outbursts can be a way of trying to cope with unhappiness or depression.

Migraines: Frequent migraine can be associated with levels of aggression and the need for anger management. A 2013 study examined migraines and its association with anger problems in young children (m = 11.2 years of age). The patients in the study were split into low migraine attack frequency (AF), intermediate AF, high frequency, and chronic migraine AF. The tendency for a participant to inhibit his anger and not lash out was found more in children with higher AF. Children that qualified for low migraine AF actually had more anger expression.

Psychological causes
Psychological factors such as stress, abuse, poor social or familial situations, and poverty can be linked to anger problems. Without proper anger management, individuals may be more prone to violence. They also may have increased stress levels, which can have both mental and physical symptoms if not taken care of sooner rather than later. Thankfully, there are many different methods of treatment that can help an individual control and cope with their anger.

Trauma 
A history of trauma can result in increased anger. Anger is not associated with aggression in all individuals with symptoms of PTSD. Sexual trauma is particularly correlated with anger, as well as childhood trauma since more often than not, they either didn't know what was going on and/or didn't have any control over what was going on. It is important to recognize and validate trauma, rather than ignoring it and having their symptoms worsen.

Types of treatment 

Some effective anger management techniques include relaxation techniques, monitored breathing exercises, cognitive restructuring and imagery (e.g. Stosny's Healing imagery Explain oneself emphatically what and why it makes you respond angrily Apply kindness and compassion to self Love oneself Solving the co-morbid problems phases), problem solving, improving communication strategies and interpersonal skills (DEAR MAN & GIVE). Below are specific types of anger management treatment approaches supported by empirical studies. Several of the studies examined used self-report, which some psychologists feel could be a limitation for results. People do not want others to think of them as angry individuals, so their answers could be changed to fit how society wants them to behave.

Prevention and Relationship Enhancement Program 

The Prevention and Relationship Enhancement Program (PREP) is a program that was used in a study consisting of Air Force families. The families were assigned to either a traditional multi-couple group format or a self-directed book version focusing on relationship satisfaction and anger management skills. There was a significant main effect for time related to both relationship satisfaction (pretest M = 49.8, SD = 17.6; post-test M = 53.8, SD = 17.6, F(1, 76) = 6.91, p < .01), and anger management skills, (pretest M = 32.2, SD = 4.2; post-test M = 34.6, SD = 4.0, F(1, 74) = 31.79, p < .001).

The self-directed book version did not show as positive of results. Improving a couple's anger management skills can be a vital step in ensuring there are no violent outbreaks throughout the relationship.

Cognitive behavioral therapy 

The use of cognitive behavioral therapy (CBT) is frequent in anger management treatment. By trying to get patients to open up about their emotions and feelings and being driven to accomplish a specific task (in this case controlling anger), a person is cognitively motivated to use positive skills towards their behavior.

Studies show using a mix of CBT as well as other therapies on the participants/clients increased the effective usage of the anger management techniques and that they also felt more in control of their own anger. Personal changes like these can lead to less aggression and fewer violent acts. The use of play therapy with this is also found efficient in tackling anger issues among children.

Positive mentalization and personal development 

This is a style that is commonly used in elementary schools for students expressing anger outbursts. Researchers who have looked into the reason for young student anger have found that one common reason could be the inability to adjust socially. Students that were selected for this study received a daily one-hour session throughout one week of school. The researchers of the mentalization program educated children through group therapy in positive psychology and tried to do activities that put the child in a happy mood while interacting. At the end of the week, research showed that there was a negative correlation between anger and social adjustment. This process lowered the overall anger levels of the students involved in social adjustment deficits.

Use of personal development (PD) led to higher views of themselves and more positive self-esteem. Aggression has been shown to be a result of poor self-worth as well as thinking that those around us do not care or support us, so this PD is vital in helping change a person's self-perception.

Anger journaling 

Understanding one's own emotions can be a crucial piece of learning how to deal with anger. Children who wrote down their negative emotions in an "anger diary" actually ended up improving their emotional understanding, which in turn led to less aggression. When it comes to dealing with their emotions, children show the ability to learn best by seeing direct examples of instances that led to certain levels of anger. By seeing the reasons why they got angry, they can in the future try to avoid those actions or be prepared for the feeling they experience if they do find themselves doing something that typically results in them being angry.

Simply logging episodes of anger could also be beneficial. Middle school students with emotional disorders who completed regular “anger logs” showed pronounced improvement of anger management. According to Keller, Bry and Salvador, students who used anger logs “were observed to exhibit significantly more prosocial behaviors toward their teachers and showed a trend toward exhibiting fewer negative behaviors toward peers”.

Reflecting on feelings of anger in writing can be a type of Cognitive Behavioral Intervention (CBI), or a self-strategy used to combat negative thoughts.

Other evidence-based approaches 

Anger management interventions are based in cognitive behavioral techniques and follow in a three-step process. First, the client learns to identify situations that can potentially trigger the feeling of anger. A situation that elicits anger is often referred to as an anger cue. If a potential trigger can be avoided, the individual can not only avoid unwanted outbursts, but also avoid internal conflict. Often anger occurs through automatic thought and irrational beliefs, these pose a problem for treatment because the patient may respond too quickly to change the thought or behavior. Wright, Day, & Howells referred to this phenomenon as the "hijacking of the cognitive system by the emotional system".  Second, relaxation techniques are taught as appropriate responses to the identified situations. Common techniques include regulating breathing and physically removing themselves from the situation. Finally, role-play is used to practice the application of the learned techniques for future encounters with anger-inducing situations in the individual's life. The result of repetition is an automatic response of learned beneficial techniques. Modifications of each general step result in distinctive programs. Additionally, different fields of psychology will change aspects of the above three-step process, which is primarily based in cognitive-behavioral therapy. Group, family, and relaxation only therapies each contribute to the wider range of available anger management programs.

Relaxation therapy can reduce cognition and motivations to act out, and through relaxation, clients gain coping skills to better manage their anger. This therapy addresses various aspects of anger such as physiological, cognitive, behavioral, and social. These aspects combined are what make relaxation an effective treatment for anger. Mindfulness attempts to teach clients acceptance of bodily sensations and emotions. Mindfulness originated in Eastern spiritual traditions that are practiced through meditation. A two-prong component of mindfulness includes: self-regulation and orientation toward the present moment. The center of this therapy technique is experiencing the present moment in a non-judgmental manner that is reflective of meditation. In practice, clients observe breathing, sitting and walking during meditations. The goal is for clients to understand that his or her thoughts of anger are merely thoughts rather than reality. Mindfulness is also a technique used in the relaxation approach because the technique halts physiological arousal. An example of this is Meditation on the Soles of the Feet (SoF) which has been shown to help persons with mild intellectual disability decrease aggressive behavior by mindfully focusing on the soles of their feet.

Rational emotive behavior therapy explains anger through the client's beliefs and emotion, rather than the event itself. The concept involves clients interpreting events in a rational manner in order to avoid irrational thoughts that lead to anger. Delayed reaction technique is when clients attempt to uncover what is making them angry before acting out on their anger. This allows them to have time to change what is making them angry and increase time before their response; this encourages thought on a more rational level. In addition, clients are also encouraged to avoid demands in an anti-oppressive order to avoid anger. An example of a demand placed on a client may be that, "I have to have this done by my standards". Research is starting to show that the better individuals understand what anger management is and how it can help them personally and in relationships, aggressive actions are less likely to occur.

Anger treatments' success rates can be difficult to estimate because excessive, severe anger is not a recognized disorder in the Diagnostic and Statistical Manual of Mental Disorders. This manual is used as a reference for mental health professionals. Some research does exist on comparing various treatments for anger, but they also describe methodological difficulties in making accurate comparisons. The best practice for anger treatment is to use multiple techniques rather than a single technique. The relaxation approach had the highest success rate as a standalone treatment. The effectiveness of the CBT-based anger management therapies has been evaluated by a number of meta-analyses. In a 1998 meta-analysis with 50 studies and 1640 individuals, measures of anger and aggression were used to compare the effects of the anger management intervention with no treatment. A significant effect for anger management was found with a 67% chance of improvement for individuals having received the anger management as compared to the individuals without the therapy. In addition, a 2009 meta-analysis compared psychological treatments for anger across 96 studies. After an average of 8 sessions, a significant improvement in anger reduction resulted. Overall, the completion of an anger management program is likely to result in long-lasting positive changes in behavior. Successful interventions can result in not only a reduction of the outward display of aggression, but also a decrease in the internal level of anger.

Medication 
As anger is a psychological concern, treating with medication is a secondary line of approach. However, if there is a medical reason for an anger response certain psychotropic medications are prescribed by doctors to complement the psychotherapy intervention. Medications include Antidepressants, Anti-psychotics, Anti-seizure and Beta blockers. These drugs specifically do not target anger directly, but they have a calming outcome that can support control of rage and negative feeling.

Antidepressants may have a particular role when anger is a manifestation of depression. Anger attacks are found in 40% of those with major depressive disorder with 64–71% of cases responding to an SSRI such as fluoxetine.

Valerian roots and saffron threads are herbal supplements that supposedly help in lowering stress and promotes calm feelings. Passionflower and chamomile are generally consumed in tea for supporting mood by reducing anxiety.

Affected populations

Adults
One motivation for seeking anger management can be career-related. As both a preventative and corrective tool, anger management is available to help individuals cope with potentially anger-inducing aspects of their jobs. One such situation applies to caretakers of individuals with mental illness. The daily stress combined with slow or no progress with the people under their care can create a high level of frustration. Skills training for caretakers of relatives with dementia has been developed to help cope with these feelings of frustration in a positive manner.

Anger management is also beneficial in law enforcement. The role of police officers is to protect civilians, however, conflicts between the police and the general public can develop. The goal of anger management would be to reduce such occurrences like police brutality from negatively impacting the relationship between law enforcement and citizens. Anger management programs tailored towards this goal could orient themselves towards these means by focusing on conflict resolution and including specific law enforcement scenarios in the training. This need was noticed by Novaco, who originally designed an intervention for anger management based on cognitive behavioral therapy, resulting in a specialized skills training program for law enforcement.

Couples also in the brink of dissolution of their marriage need to understand what to do about intimate partner violence, and the more knowledgeable the individuals are on how to manage their anger, the better prepared they are when confronted with a problem with another person.

Children and adolescents
The ability for young children to understand their emotions and how to react in certain situations can greatly increase their chance of expressing themselves in an appropriate manner. A 2010 study from the Journal of Applied School Psychology looked at four 4th grade boys who took part in different activities with the school psychologist, ranging from how to deal with emotions to practicing anger reduction strategies. They found a positive correlation between partaking in these meetings and less anger expressing in a multitude of locations (school, home, etc.).

Anger management programs with a cognitive-behavioral basis have been modified for children and adolescents. There are three common types of CBT aimed at the youth. First, life skills development (communication, empathy, assertiveness, etc.) uses modeling to teach appropriate reactions to anger. Second, effective education focuses on identifying the feelings of anger and relaxation. Finally, problem solving conveys a view of cause and effect for situations as an alternative to anger. A wide range of methods can be used to convey these three components, with both age and severity being important factors. For younger children, involvement can be increased by presenting anger management in more of a fun format with educational games and activities being available. For adolescents, group therapy can be an effective form given the resemblance to the individual's natural social environment. The severity of expressed anger issues often relates to the intensity of the subsequent anger management program. A few violent outbursts in a classroom setting could result in several sessions with the school's counselor. However, more severe juvenile delinquency could result in court-mandated anger management sessions in a juvenile correctional facility.

The effectiveness of anger management has been studied in children and adolescents for the purpose of evaluating existing programs and designing more effective programs. In a meta-analyses of 40 studies, an overall effect size of 0.67 was found for CBT anger management treatment, suggesting anger management as a legitimate approach to problematic levels of anger. Skills development (0.79) and problem solving (0.67) both had a higher impact than affective education (0.36). This was believed to be due to behavioral aspects being more easily conveyed than cognitive for children. The true value from early interventions aimed at youths comes from the preventative aspect. Curbing negative behaviors early in life could lead to a more positive outlook as an adult.

Individuals with intellectual disabilities

Individuals with intellectual disabilities can struggle with managing anger. When faced with aggression from individuals with an intellectual disability, caretakers often employ a combination of four different strategies. Depending on both the setting and individual, the following strategies for aggression minimization present in different ways.

 Reactive strategies – Aim to minimize impact of overtly aggressive behavior by using established protocols. Ex. Enforced isolation after the start of a violent outburst.
 Ecological interventions – Attempt to reduce aggression level by changing an aspect of the environment for a more calming effect. Ex. Reducing ambient noise to lower irritation.
 Contingency management – Focuses on modifying behavior through a combination of reinforcement and punishment. Ex. Using a token economy to enforce rules concerning behavior.
 Positive programming – Teaches positive reaction skills as an alternative to aggression. Ex. Anger management with a CBT background.

The need for anger management is also evident in situations where individuals with intellectual disabilities are prescribed psychotropic medication as the result of aggressive or self-injurious behavior. The medication's role as a chemical restraint does not help modify the underlying cause of aggression. Sedation is best used as an emergency measure with skills training as a long-term solution to decreasing the overall rate of violent incidents. In a meta-analysis reviewing 80 studies, behavioral-based interventions were found to be generally effective in modifying behavior. Additionally, cognitive behavioral therapy as administered by lay therapists was found to be effective, which supports the feasibility of such anger management programs.

This is a group that a majority of the population might not associate with having AM problems, but research shows over half of the population of Americans with intellectual disabilities displays violent and aggressive actions somewhat regularly. People with a learning disability tend to express anger and aggression to even those who help them on a daily basis. Adults with intellectual disabilities are at high risk of acting aggressive and being sent to clinics due to their actions.

The "theory of the mind" approach states that people with anger management problems tend to be unsteady mentally and are not able to internalize any blame for their actions. One of the main reasons for anger outbursts is externalizing blame and having a quick impulse to lash out. These individuals need to have a better understanding of what their actions mean and that they should understand that blaming themselves for problems can sometimes be the right thing to do.

Violent criminals 

One study found that offenders who were currently in high-security hospitals that went through a self-report 20 class training program had positive results. Results of the self-report showed a decrease in aggression and a lack of responding when angry. There were two issues to keep in mind though; a hospital setting and a setting in which the researchers did not want to provoke much anger due to the instability of the patients.

In one meta-analysis study composed of studies completed from 1979 to 2010, school-aged children who were identified as having aggressive personalities were given several different anger management classes. Overall, results showed slightly positive results for children receiving the classes (less aggression). The courses aimed at reducing negative emotions in the children and trying to help them with self-control. While no overarching conclusions could be made, researchers state that children going through anger management courses are more prepared to combat their anger internally and less likely to act out.

Substance abusers 

There is no statistical information that shows people who substance abuse also have high rates of aggressive actions. However, researchers believe this is a group of people that should be studied due to their questionable decision-making and typically unstable mental health. Substance abusers could benefit from anger management to prevent potential aggression.

Post-traumatic stress disorder (PTSD) individuals 

This group can benefit from extended CBT dealing with anger management issues. One study dealing with n= 86 war veterans found that during the 12 sessions of training, anger traits slightly dropped as well as small reductions in expressing anger. Research also indicates that their antisocial personality traits upon return can put them behind in society, so finding the right anger management courses is of vital importance. There were not significant enough findings from this study to definitely recommend veterans with PTSD to use CBT anger management courses.

People with traumatic brain injuries 

People with a traumatic brain injury (TBI) can display impulsive, aggressive and dangerous actions. A study in the Brain Injury showed that one way to prevent such actions is a community-based treatment of people with TBI. Results indicated that the need to lash out diminished after the 12-week program, and a series of post-treatment testing showed a decline in self-reported frequency of angry actions. Other specific results included: significant decreases in the frequency of experiencing angry feelings and the frequency of outward expression of anger as well as significant increases in the frequency of controlling feelings of anger.

Associated scholars

Seneca 

One of the first people to study anger and the control of anger was the Roman philosopher Seneca. He studied anger during his lifetime, c. 4 BC – AD 65, and from his experiences and observations he formulated ways to control anger. This could be considered an early form of anger management. Seneca noted the importance of how to avoid becoming angry, how to quit being angry, and how to deal with anger in other people.
Before him, Athenodorus Cananites (74 BC – 7 AD) counseled Octavian to recite the alphabet before acting in anger.

Another theorist who came after Seneca was Galen, a Roman era philosopher, who built on the work of Seneca to formulate new ideas in the area of anger management. Galen stresses the importance of a mentor to help deal with excess anger.

Peter Stearns 

Sir Peter Stearns played an important part in researching the differences in anger between genders. Stearns concluded that there are similarities between male and females experience of anger. June Crawford came up with an opposing idea about how the two genders deal with anger. Her research concluded that men and women deal with anger by different means.

Raymond Novaco 
Works from Raymond Novaco in the 1970s have contributed to many of the recent ideas on the management of anger. These ideas have led to the implementation of different anger management programs. Novaco stressed the importance of looking at the situations that led up to the anger in order to have control over the anger. He stated that anger is an emotional response to situations, and that anger occurs in three modalities, either cognitive, somaticaffective or behavioral. After discovering the anger, there should be discussion and self-examination in order to relieve the anger. This process was thought to help the client identify the situations that lead to anger and deal with the anger depending on the step that the anger is occurring in. The client is able to use different relaxation skills to reduce their anger before it advances.

Benefits
The benefits of undergoing anger management brings around the successful reduction in anger and violent outbursts. Personal relationships that have been previously strained by a high level of aggression may undergo improvement. Professionally, workplace relationships have a similar outcome that are beneficial to an individual's career and personal sense of satisfaction. Legally, continued attendance to anger management programs, mandated or not, can be seen as a sign of good faith. For incarcerated individuals, an earlier parole time can be the result of good behavior learned from anger management classes. From an emotional standpoint, reducing the internal level of anger results in a decrease in stress and an increase in overall happiness as a result.

From a medical standpoint, physical illnesses also improve from positive emotional and behavioral changes. Anger management style and overall level of anger has been associated with both acute and chronic pain sensitivity. Blood pressure is another physiological aspect effected by anger, with increased levels of anger being correlated with higher blood pressure. The implications of an effect on blood pressure for overall health is made evident by the link between high blood pressure and the increased risk of cardiovascular disease. An increase in the immune system's efficacy has also been observed as a result of the increased level of relaxation. Successful anger management could also lead to an overall longer life span due to the decrease in reckless behavior and violent altercations.

Impediments
There are a number of factors that can lower the probability of a successful anger management intervention. One such obstacle is the level of the individual's motivation. Overall low readiness is an impediment to the effectiveness of anger management due to the lower attendance rates and negative effect on the therapeutic alliance. Involuntary assignment to an anger management program, for example court mandated sessions, will result in a lower average motivation level than voluntary admission. In one study with incarcerated inmates, there was a correlation found between individual readiness and improvement.

Additionally, given the component of anger as a social construct, difficulty with communication between cultures can serve as another impediment. What is deemed an appropriate expression of anger is culturally dependent. Therefore, a mismatch between client and therapist could result in a misunderstanding as to the end goal of the program. For example, a client could only wish to decrease physical violence, while the therapist aims to decrease both verbal and physical outbursts. Gender-dependent expectations of anger expression can contribute as well to societal standards. The same violent outburst for a man and woman is subject to different interpretations due to anger being seen as more permissible in males.

The cost of taking anger management could also be a significant obstacle if the person does not have health insurance. The time required for anger management depends on the program. Weekly one-hour sessions with eight to 12 sessions per program are common, but a single intensive all-day session variety exists as well. The monetary cost can amount to $90–$120 per session for general therapy, or much higher fees for specialized coaching. The availability of anger management programs locally can be problematic for more isolated areas, creating an additional cost for travel. However, online options can follow the same structure as an in-person intervention with similar outcomes.

Religion
An Islamic hadith-i-sherif states, "Whoever is overtaken by anger (ghadab) should sit down if he is standing up.  If anger continues, he should lie down on one of his sides!"

See also

References

External links
 American Psychological Association – Anger
 Canadian Mental Health Association (CMHA) Tips
 Psychological Self Help
 Anger Management Villanova University, Pennsylvania
 Anger Management Techniques

Psychotherapies
Mindfulness (psychology)